Allobates brunneus (common name: Chupada rocket frog) is a species of frog in the family Aromobatidae. It is found in the southern Amazon drainage in Brazil to Mato Grosso and Amazonas and into extreme northern Bolivia. It has been often confused with other species, including undescribed ones.
Its natural habitats are margins of lakes and pools of stagnant water in tropical rainforest and seasonally flooded forest. It is threatened by habitat loss.

References

brunneus
Amphibians of Bolivia
Amphibians of Brazil
Taxonomy articles created by Polbot
Amphibians described in 1887